Bartolomé Mitre Martínez (26 June 1821 – 19 January 1906) was an Argentine statesman, soldier and author. He was President of Argentina from 1862 to 1868 and the first president of unified Argentina.

Mitre is known as the most versatile statesman, military man, politician, journalist, historian, writer and poet. He was a major figure in the history of Argentina during second half of the 19th century.

He was the figure that best characterized liberalism in Argentina, but he was a moderate and flexible liberal, not dogmatic.

Early life
Mitre was born on 26 June 1821 in Buenos Aires.  His father was of Greek descent and the family name was originally Mitropoulos.

In 1831, his family settled in Uruguay. He became a soldier, and graduated in 1839 from the Military School of Montevideo, with the rank of second lieutenant of artillery.  Also a journalist, his writings supported Fructuoso Rivera, who, in 1846, made him a lieutenant colonel in the Uruguayan Army.

Later he joined the Colorado Party in the civil wars against the Blancos, in the Banda Oriental (Uruguay). This closeness with the Colorados led him to support the unitario faction of Argentina, which simultaneously fought against the Rosista regime in Buenos Aires, ally of the Uruguayan blancos.

His first poems and journalistic publications in the Uruguayan media date from that time.

He then moved to Bolivia, and later to Chile, where he met fellow Argentine exile Juan Bautista Alberdi. Both wrote for the Valparaíso newspaper El Comercio. Later, he wrote in El Progreso, in Santiago, under the direction of Domingo Faustino Sarmiento.

End of exile and return to Argentina
Mitre returned to Argentina after the defeat of longtime caudillo Juan Manuel de Rosas at the 1852 Battle of Caseros. He was a leader of the revolt of Buenos Aires Province against Justo José de Urquiza's federal system in the Revolution of 11 September 1852, and was appointed to important posts in the provincial government after the Province seceded from the Confederation.

President of Argentina
The civil war of 1859, after the revolt of Buenos Aires against Justo José de Urquiza's federal system, resulted in Mitre's defeat by Urquiza at the Battle of Cepeda, in 1860. Issues of customs revenue sharing were settled, and Buenos Aires reentered the Argentine Confederation. Victorious at the 1861 Battle of Pavón, however, Mitre obtained important concessions from the national army, notably the amendment of the Constitution to provide for indirect elections through an electoral college. In October 1862, Mitre was elected president of the republic, and national political unity was finally achieved; a period of internal progress and reform then commenced. During the Paraguayan War, Mitre was initially named the head of the allied forces.

Mitre was also the founder of La Nación, one of South America's leading newspapers, in 1870. His opposition to Autonomist Party nominee Adolfo Alsina, whom he viewed as a veiled Buenos Aires separatist, led Mitre to run for the presidency again, though the seasoned Alsina outmaneuvered him by fielding Nicolás Avellaneda, a moderate lawyer from remote Tucuman Province where the independence of Argentina had been declared in 1816. The electoral college met on 12 April 1874, and awarded Mitre only three provinces, including Buenos Aires.

Mitre took up arms again. Hoping to prevent Avellaneda's 12 October inauguration, he hijacked a gunboat; he was defeated, however, and only President Avellaneda's commutation spared his life. Following the 1890 Revolution of the Park, he broke with the conservative National Autonomist Party (PAN) and co-founded the Civic Union with reformist Leandro Alem. Mitre's desire to maintain an understanding with the ruling PAN led to the Civic Union's schism in 1891, upon which Mitre founded the National Civic Union, and Alem, the Radical Civic Union (the oldest existing party in Argentina).

He dedicated much of his time in later years to writing. According to some of his critics, as a historian Mitre made questionable judgments, often ignoring key documents and events on purpose in his writings. This caused his student Adolfo Saldías to distance himself from him, and for future revisionist historians such as José María Rosa to question the validity of his work altogether. He also wrote poetry and fiction (Soledad: novela original), and translated Dante's La divina commedia (The Divine Comedy) into Spanish.  He was the grandfather of poet, Margarita Abella Caprile.  Like many other nineteenth century Argentines prominent in public life, he was a freemason.

Death and legacy
Bartolomé Mitre died in 1906, affected by a gastrointestinal illness. The charismatic leader was mourned by a crowd rarely seen until then, who accompanied the funeral procession from his home to La Recoleta Cemetery.

Bartolomé Mitre was the paradigm of the Argentine statesman of the 19th century. Mitre thematically returns to the ideals of May Revolution and lists the principles of the Freedom Party, the first Argentine party that consciously launches itself into political struggle with a liberal program. The program of the Freedom Party is the faithful synthesis of the democratic progressivism that Esteban Echeverría longed for to overcome the sterile antagonism of unitarians and federalists.

As an intellectual, he wrote poetry, theater, countless newspaper articles, cemented historical science with his exemplary biographies, translated classic works, and authored fiery harangues. Mitre was a leading figure in politics and culture until his death in 1906.

Mitre supported the establishment of universal direct suffrage, which was ultimately established in 1912, during the presidency of Roque Sáenz Peña.

When he assumed the presidency in 1862, the conditions in which the republic was found were precarious. The treasury was exhausted, the debts were large, the three national powers needed to be organized, buildings to house them separately from the provincial authorities had to be established, the question of the residence of the national authorities in the city of Buenos Aires had to be solved, the army and updated salaries had to be established, the minimum structures of the national public administration were created, and the basic program of their generation was promoted: education, immigration, foreign investment, railways, and land occupation. An appreciation of Mitre's government work that ignores his point of origin will not do him enough justice.

Referring to Mitre's financial rectitude, the explorer Sir Richard Burton wrote:  

Wrote Robert Avrett:

Bibliography
Mitre ranks as an important South-American historiographer. He wrote the best accounts of South America's wars of independence and published many works, amongst which are:
 
 Historia de Belgrano y de la independencia argentina ["History of Belgrano and of the argentine independence"] (1857; fifth edition, four volumes, 1902)
 Historia de San Martín y de la emancipación sudamericana ["History of San Martín"] (1869; third edition, six volumes, 1907) 
 Rimas ["Rimes"] (new edition, 1890) 
 Ulrich Schmidl, primer historiador del Rio de la Plata ["Ulrich Schmidl, first historian of the Rio de la Plata"] (1890)

There is an abridged translation of the Historia de San Martín, entitled The Emancipation of South America (London, 1893) by W. Pilling. Mitre's speeches were collected as Arengas (third edition, three volumes, 1902).

Gallery

References
 J. J. Biedma, El Teniente General Bartolomé Mitre, in Bartolomé Mitre, Arengas, volume iii (Buenos Aires, 1902).  
 William H. Katra, The Argentine Generation of 1837: Echeverría, Alberdi, Sarmiento, Mitre (Madison, N.J.: Fairleigh Dickinson University Press, 1996).

External links

 
 
 

1821 births
1906 deaths
People from Buenos Aires
Argentine people of Greek descent
Unitarianists (Argentina)
Civic Union (Argentina) politicians
National Civic Union (Argentina) politicians
Presidents of Argentina
Argentine generals
Argentine military personnel of the Paraguayan War
19th-century Argentine historians
Argentine male writers
Argentine journalists
Male journalists
Argentine translators
Argentine Freemasons
English–Spanish translators
French–Spanish translators
Italian–Spanish translators
Latin–Spanish translators
Translators of Dante Alighieri
Argentine newspaper founders
Burials at La Recoleta Cemetery
Governors of Buenos Aires Province
19th-century translators
19th-century journalists
19th-century Argentine writers
19th-century Italian male writers
Male non-fiction writers
Patrician families of Buenos Aires